In ships, frames are ribs that are transverse bolted or welded to the keel. Frames support the hull and give the ship its shape and strength.

In wooden shipbuilding, each frame is composed of several sections, so that the grain of the wood can follow the curve of the frame. Starting from the keel, these are the floor (which crosses the keel and joins the frame to the keel), the first futtock, the second futtock, the top timber, and the rail stanchion. In steel shipbuilding, the entire frame can be formed in one piece by rivetting or welding sections; in this case the floor remains a separate piece, joining the frame on each side to the keel.

Frame numbers are the numerical values given to the frames; they begin at 1 with the forward-most frame, and numbers increase sequentially towards the stern. The total number vary per the length of a ship. Frame numbers tell you where you are in relation to the bow of the ship; the numbers increase as you go aft.

The frames support lengthwise members which run parallel to the keel, from the bow to the stern; these may variously be called stringers, strakes, or clamps.  The clamp supports the transverse deck beams, on which the deck is laid.

References

Further reading

External links
Navy Ship Compartment Numbering

Nautical terminology
Shipbuilding